Acaste (Ancient Greek: Ἀκάστη) was the name of two figures in Greek mythology.

Acaste, one of the Oceanids. She was among the companions of Persephone when Persephone was abducted by Hades.
Acaste, the nurse of the daughters of king Adrastus of Argos.

Notes

References
 Hesiod, Theogony, in The Homeric Hymns and Homerica with an English Translation by Hugh G. Evelyn-White, Cambridge, Massachusetts, Harvard University Press; London, William Heinemann Ltd. 1914. Online version at the Perseus Digital Library.
 Homeric Hymn 2 to Demeter, in The Homeric Hymns and Homerica with an English Translation by Hugh G. Evelyn-White, Cambridge, Massachusetts, Harvard University Press; London, William Heinemann Ltd. 1914. Online version at the Perseus Digital Library.
 Parada, Carlos, Genealogical Guide to Greek Mythology, Jonsered, Paul Åströms Förlag, 1993. .
 Statius, Statius with an English Translation by J. H. Mozley, Volume I, Silvae, Thebaid, Books I–IV, Loeb Classical Library No. 206, London: William Heinemann, Ltd., New York: G. P. Putnamm's Sons, 1928. . Internet Archive.

Women in Greek mythology

Characters in Greek mythology